Robert John Davi (born June 26, 1953) is an American actor, singer and filmmaker. Over the course of his acting career, Davi has performed in more than 130 films. Among his most known roles are opera-singing heavy Jake Fratelli in The Goonies (1985), Vietnam veteran and FBI Special Agent Johnson in Die Hard (1988), James Bond villain Franz Sanchez in Licence to Kill (1989), police deputy chief Phil Heinemann in Predator 2 (1990) and strip club manager Al Torres in Showgirls (1995). On television, he portrayed FBI Special Agent Bailey Malone in the NBC television series Profiler (1996–2000).

Classically trained as a singer, Davi launched his professional singing career in 2011. His first album, Davi Sings Sinatra – On The Road To Romance, hit No. 6 on the Billboard jazz charts. Praised for his voice and vocal interpretations, Davi debuted as a headliner at The Venetian Las Vegas, six months after the record was released.

In 2016, Davi replaced Jerry Doyle as radio host for a nationally syndicated radio program on Talk Radio Network.

Early life 
Davi was born in 1953, in Astoria, Queens, New York, the son of Maria and Sal Davi. His mother was an Italian American whose family came from Nusco, Avellino, Campania and his father was from Torretta, Palermo, Sicily.

Davi spoke Italian during his childhood. He attended Seton Hall, a Roman Catholic high school in Patchogue, New York. He has two sisters, Yvonne Davi (deceased), and Michelle Queal. He graduated from Hofstra University, which he attended because of that university's strong drama department as well as its unique reproduction of Shakespeare's Globe Theater. Davi studied with acting coach Stella Adler when he moved to Manhattan.

Film career

Acting career 
Davi made his motion picture debut in Contract On Cherry Street, in which he shared the screen with Frank Sinatra. He subsequently worked with Marlon Brando, Clint Eastwood, Arnold Schwarzenegger, Benicio del Toro, Bruce Willis, and Roberto Benigni, among others. He has appeared in films including The Goonies, Die Hard, Showgirls, Son of the Pink Panther, and in the Bond film Licence to Kill (1989) as the villain Franz Sanchez, a South American drug lord and murderer. In 2014, Davi appeared as Goran Vata in The Expendables 3.

In 2015, Davi appeared in a music video for Bob Dylan's recording of "The Night They Called It A Day", from Dylan's album Shadows In The Night, a selection of songs which had been recorded by Frank Sinatra. Rolling Stone suggested that Davi's role in the video may be a nod towards Davi's having made his acting debut alongside Sinatra in the crime film Contract on Cherry Street, and Davi's release of his own album of Sinatra covers.

In 2015, he interpreted Gabriele Tinti's poetry giving voice to the Boxer at Rest at the Getty Museum.

Directing career 

In 2007, Davi made his directorial debut with The Dukes, a parable regarding the mid-2000 economic crisis and its impact. The film starred himself, Chazz Palminteri, and Peter Bogdanovich. The Dukes was selected for the premiere section at the Rome Film Festival, along with films by Francis Ford Coppola, Sean Penn, Robert Redford, and Sidney Lumet. Davi was the only first-time director in the premiere section.

Davi directed his third film, My Son Hunter, it was released on September 7, 2022.

Recording career 

In high school, Davi was praised for his singing, and auditioned for the Metropolitan Opera after being awarded first place at the prestigious New York State School Music Association's Solo Competition, where he sang Vincent Youman's "Without A Song". He subsequently received classical training with top vocal teachers, Samuel Margolis and Danial Ferro of Juilliard and Tito Gobbi. Davi damaged his voice, and later explained that he was a baritone with the "heart of a tenor and had pushed too hard, too early."

Davi began to focus again on singing in 2011, and worked with "Voice Builder" Gary Catona as he prepared to record his first children's album.

With a thirty-piece orchestra, he recorded the album at the Capitol Records Building in Hollywood, where Frank Sinatra recorded on many occasions.

The album, which featured new arrangements by composer Nic. tenBroek, was produced by Phil Ramone, engineered by Dan Wallin, and mixed by Al Schmitt. The album, Davi Sings Sinatra -- On The Road To Romance, was released October 24, 2011, and received attention from the media, garnering positive reviews. Jazztimes called Davi Sings Sinatra "uniformly impressive", and critic Don Heckman wrote in the Orange County Register that "there are, of course, dozens of Sinatra imitators and simulators. But what Davi does is a whole different matter. A tribute? Yes, indeed; all that and more." AllMusic noted that "Davi makes no attempt to copy Sinatra's vocal sound ... Rather, he is his own singer." The album reached the Top 10 on the Billboard jazz charts.

In December 2012, Davi appeared along with Roger Cicero in the French/German Arte TV program Durch die Nacht mit … The episode was shot in the Little Italy area of New York City and featured conversation between Cicero and Davi and solos of Sinatra standards by both performers. In December 2013, Davi released a Christmas single, "Mistletoe and Holly", with all proceeds benefiting The Salvation Army.

Davi has lent his voice to political ads, including Carly Fiorina's "Demon Sheep" attack ad, "Hot Air: The Movie", and others produced by Republican media consultant Fred Davis.

Davi was chosen by the United Nations to celebrate the Transformative Power of Music at the General Assembly in New York, in June 2015 – and again for the 70th Anniversary Celebration of the UN in September 2015.

Davi was chosen to tribute Sinatra's 100th birthday for the July 4 PBS special; it was watched by 500,000 people outside the Capitol Building in DC and 15 million viewers.

Davi was the guest singer on the Italian version of the TV program The Voice.

Personal life 

Davi is a Roman Catholic.

Davi has been married four times having been divorced three times. His first marriage was to Jan Borenstein, the marriage lasted from 1970 to 1980. His second marriage was to Jeri McBride which lasted from 1980 to 1990, they had one son, Sean Christian Davi who was born in 1981. His third marriage was to Christine Bolster which lasted from 1990 to 2019. They have four children together, their first daughter, Ariana Marie Davi who was born on April 3, 1990, followed by a second daughter, Frances Davi who was born in 1992. They also had twins, their third daughter, Isabella and one son, Nicolas Edward Davi who were born on January 11, 2001. Davi married his fourth wife Diana Davi in 2019 and they have a daughter, Gabriela Nicole Davi who was born later that year.

Politics 
He is an outspoken political conservative, often speaking at Republican Party gatherings. He has been invited to comment on numerous political shows and backed John McCain during his presidential campaign. He narrated several film montages that aired during the 2008 Republican National Convention. Davi has spoken at numerous Conservative Political Action Conferences in Washington, D.C. He was a frequent guest on Fox News's late-night satire program Red Eye w/ Greg Gutfeld. Davi endorsed Donald Trump in the 2016 U.S. presidential election, and again in 2020.

Awards and honors 
For his contributions to the Italian community, Davi was enshrined in Toronto's Italian Walk of Fame in 2013.

He was nominated for a Golden Raspberry Award for Worst Supporting Actor for his portrayal of Al Torres in Showgirls (1995).

Filmography

Film

Television

Video games

Music videos

References

External links 

 Davi Sings Sinatra
 

1953 births
American people of Italian descent
American Roman Catholics
People of Sicilian descent
People of Campanian descent
American male film actors
American male television actors
Hofstra University alumni
Male actors from New York City
New York (state) Republicans
People from Queens, New York
People from Suffolk County, New York
American jazz singers
American male singers
20th-century American male actors
21st-century American male actors
Living people
Catholics from New York (state)
Jazz musicians from New York (state)
American male jazz musicians